Uzhavarkarai is a city, a municipality and a taluk in Puducherry district in the union territory of Puducherry. The enclaves of Kalapet and Alankuppam are parts of Uzhavarkarai municipality. Uzhavarkarai is also the only sub-taluk (firka) in Uzhavarkarai Taluk of Pondicherry district.

Demographics
 India census, Uzhavarkarai had a population of 300,104. Males constitute 49.48% of the population and females 50.52%. Uzhavarkarai has an average literacy rate of 77%, higher than the national average of 59.5%: male literacy is 83%, and female literacy is 71%. In Uzhavarkarai, 11% of the population is under 6 years of age.

References

 
Cities and towns in Puducherry district
Municipalities of Puducherry